Iliyana Gocheva (born 11 February 1976) is a retired Bulgarian female volleyball player.

She was part of the Bulgaria women's national volleyball team at the 1998 FIVB Volleyball Women's World Championship in Japan, and the 2002 FIVB Volleyball Women's World Championship in Germany.

References

External links
 

1976 births
Living people
Bulgarian women's volleyball players
Place of birth missing (living people)
Middle blockers